The Lorena Ochoa Invitational was a women's professional golf tournament in México on the LPGA Tour. Hosted by Lorena Ochoa, the event debuted in November 2008 at the course where she learned to play, Guadalajara Country Club in Guadalajara.

The Lorena Ochoa Invitational was a 72-hole limited-field tournament, limited to 36 golfers. The top five in the Rolex Women's World Rankings were invited, in addition to the top 26 players on the LPGA money list not already in the field via the rankings. Another five players were invited through sponsor exemptions.

In November 2016, it was announced that the event would move to the first week of May in 2017 as a match play event, the Lorena Ochoa Match Play, with a field of 64 players and $1.2 million purse. The event was not included on the 2018 schedule.

During the fall of 2018, Mexican media outlets reported a possible return in time for the event to be included in the 2019 LPGA Tour season.

Course layout
Club de Golf México

Winners
As a match play event 

As a stroke play event

Tournament record

References

External links
 
Coverage on the LPGA's official site

Former LPGA Tour events
Golf tournaments in Mexico
Sport in Guadalajara, Jalisco
Sports competitions in Mexico City
Recurring events established in 2008
Recurring events disestablished in 2017
2008 establishments in Mexico
2017 disestablishments in Mexico
21st century in Guadalajara, Jalisco
Women's sport in Mexico